Sir Eric Teichman  (born Erik Teichmann; 16 January 1884 – 3 December 1944 in Norfolk, England) was a British diplomat, orientalist, travel writer and photographer.

He was a son of Emil Teichmann and Mary Lydia Schroeter, and younger brother of Max Teichmann (1876, Eltham, Kent -1963) and  Oskar Teichman (1880, Eltham, Kent - 1959). He was educated at Gonville and Caius College, Cambridge University. At the time of his death, he had been serving as adviser to the British Embassy at Chungking.

Travels
Teichman has been described as "one of British diplomacy's dashing characters, [a] flamboyantly enigmatic explorer-cum-special agent.  He went on a number of "special missions" and "fact-finding journeys" throughout Central Asia, as early as before World War I.  In 1935 he travelled by truck across the Tarim Basin to Kashgar, and there by pony and on foot across the Pamir and Karakoram ranges to Gilgit, and then to New Delhi.  In 1943 he began his final foreign journey from Chongqing.  After caravanning as far as Lanzhou, his truck continued along the outer Silk Road, across the Tarim basin, and over the Pamir Mountains to New Delhi. From there he flew back to England, where a few days later, at the age of 60, he was killed.

Murder
On 3 December 1944, whilst at home at Honingham Hall, his estate in Norfolk, England, Teichman heard the sound of gunfire nearby. He went out to confront two poachers (Private George E. Smith of Pittsburgh and Private Leonard S. Wijpacha of Detroit) who were trespassing in the grounds of his estate. Both intruders were American soldiers based at a nearby USAAF airfield and each was armed with an M1 carbine. Teichman was killed during the confrontation, receiving a fatal gunshot wound to the head.

Private Smith (army serial number: 33288266) was given a psychological examination in January 1945, subsequently court-martialled at RAF Attlebridge with a conviction of murder. He was executed by hanging on the gallows at HMP Shepton Mallet on 8 May 1945 (i.e. VE day), despite appeals for clemency, including from Lady Ellen Teichman. His companion, Private Wijpacha was charged with being an accessory to murder, but was not sentenced to death. Smith's remains are buried in grave 52, row 3 in Oise-Aisne American Cemetery Plot E, France.

Teichman was buried in the churchyard of St Andrew's Church, Honingham. His grave is in the corner plot, directly in line with the now-demolished Honingham Hall. His widow was buried in the same grave in 1969.

Literary works 

 Teichman, Eric. 1916. "Routes in Kan-su". The Geographical Journal. Wiley. 48 (6): 473–79. .
 Travels of a Consular Officer in North-West China: With Original Maps of Shensi and Kansu and Illustrated by Photographs Taken by the Author, 1921.
 Travels of a Consular Officer in Eastern Tibet: Together with a History of the Relations between China, Tibet and India, 1922.
 Journey to Turkistan, 1937.
 Affairs of China, 1938.

References

Sources

Winchester, Simon The Man Who Loved China: The Fantastic Story of the Eccentric Scientist Who Unlocked the Mysteries of the Middle Kingdom, Harper Collins, 2008.

External links
Archives Hub: Teichmann Papers at www.archiveshub.ac.uk
 at www.richard.clark32.btinternet.co.uk
 

1884 births
1944 deaths
Explorers of Central Asia
British diplomats
British orientalists
English photographers
English travel writers
British civilians killed in World War II
Alumni of Gonville and Caius College, Cambridge
Deaths by firearm in England
People from Honingham
People murdered in England
Knights Grand Cross of the Order of St Michael and St George
Companions of the Order of the Indian Empire
20th-century British diplomats